Xuanhua Steel Group Co., Ltd.() or Xuansteel is a state-owned iron and steel enterprise located in Xuanhua District, Hebei Province, China, which is mainly engaged in Steel business. In 2006, the company incoperated into the Tangsteel Group.

In 2008, Tangsteel merged with Hansteel and formed the Hebei Steel Group (Hesteel), becoming China's largest and the world's fifth largest steel company.

In 2016, Hebei Province introduced a plan to shut down the old factory in Xuanhua District, Zhangjiakou before 2020, and start the construction of new factory located in Laoting County, Tangshan in April, 2017.

References 

Government-owned companies of China
Steel companies of China
Companies based in Zhangjiakou
Chinese companies established in 1919
Manufacturing companies established in 1919
Xuanhua